Jacques Berlinerblau is a Professor of Jewish Civilization at the Edmund A. Walsh School of Foreign Service at Georgetown University. He has doctorates in Ancient Near Eastern languages and literature (from NYU) and theoretical sociology (from the New School for Social Research). He has published ten books on a wide variety of scholarly subjects with special attention to secularism, secular aesthetics, Jewish-American literature (Philip Roth's fiction in particular), African-American and Jewish-American relations and biblical literature. Berlinerblau has also written about professors and their discontents in Campus Confidential: How College Works, Or Doesn't, For Professors, Students, and Parents and in numerous articles about the Humanities for The Chronicle of Higher Education.

From 2007 to 2009 he wrote the blog The God Vote, an exploration of the role of faith in the 2008 U.S. presidential race, for Newsweek 's On Faith website.

Berlinerblau hosted and produced the show Faith Complex which was described as "a dialogue about the intersection of religion, politics and art." In 2010 he launched a second show with The Washington Post's Sally Quinn entitled "The God Vote" which focussed on news cycle issues involving faith and politics. In addition to this work in visual media, Berlinerblau blogged for The Chronicle of Higher Education'''s "Brainstorm" page between 2010 and 2012. He wrote about secularism, literature, and various subjects in higher education. His work on religion and politics and the 2012 election also appeared in the Huffington Post.

Outside his usual publications on scholarly areas of interest, Berlinerblau has turned his attention to the interview format in recent years.

His guests in the arts have included:
 Georgetown Professor Michael Eric Dyson discussing hip-hop theology
 Director of the Washington Ballet Septime Webre on homophobia and ballet
 Novelist Cynthia Ozick 
 Novelist Gary Shteyngart 
 Novelist David Bezmozgis 
 Novelist Lara Vapnyar 
 Dr. Derek Parker Royal (founder of the Philip Roth Society)
 Literary critics Adam Kirsch and Liel Leibovitz discussing Philip Roth's career;

Some of his interview subjects in the political sphere have included:
The former President of Poland, Aleksander Kwaśniewski 
The former Prime Minister of Spain, José Maria Aznar
Congressman Jim Moran
The Special Envoy to Combat and Monitor Anti-Semitism, Hannah Rosenthal

BooksHeresy in the University: The Black Athena Controversy and the Responsibilities of American Intellectuals (1999, Rutgers University Press) The Secular Bible: Why Nonbelievers Must Take Religion Seriously (2005, Cambridge University Press) The Vow and the 'Popular Religious Groups' of Ancient Israel: A Philological & Sociological Inquiry (1996, Sheffield Academic Press) Thumpin’ It: The Use and Abuse of the Bible in Today’s Presidential Politics (2008, Westminster John Knox) How to be Secular: A Field Guide for Religious Moderates, Atheists and Agnostics (2012, Houghton-Mifflin Harcourt)  Campus Confidential: How College Works, or Doesn't, for Professors, Parents, and Students (2017, Melville House) Secularism: The Basics'' (2021, Routledge)

References

External links

 Homepage at Georgetown
 The Faith Complex (archived)

Walsh School of Foreign Service faculty
Living people
1966 births
New York University alumni
The New School alumni
Jewish American academics
Academics from Portland, Maine
21st-century American Jews